Turini (Aymara turi tower, -ni a suffix, "the one with a tower", also spelled Turrini) is a mountain in the eastern extensions of the Cordillera Real in the Andes of Bolivia which reaches a height of approximately . It is situated in the La Paz Department, Murillo Province, La Paz Municipality. Turini lies northeast of Phisqa Quta.

References 

Mountains of La Paz Department (Bolivia)